Richard Francis Gill (11 January 1932 – 6 September 2020) was an Australian rules footballer who played with Carlton in the Victorian Football League (VFL).

Notes

External links 

Dick Gill's profile at Blueseum

1932 births
Carlton Football Club players
2020 deaths
Australian rules footballers from Victoria (Australia)